Peter Stafford Hayden Lawrence (9 February 1913 – 18 March 2005) was a master at Eton College and The Doon School, India and an author. He was, until his death, the last surviving master at Eton to have served in the Second World War.

Lawrence was born on 9 February 1913, the son of Aubrey Trevor Lawrence KC, MBE and his wife Constance Emily Fanning. He was the grandson of Sir Trevor Lawrence, 2nd Baronet and was, until his death, heir to that title. He was educated at Eton, where his godfather, Cyril Alington, had recently been appointed head master, and at Christ Church, Oxford, his father's college, where he read science and mathematics.

During his time at Oxford he returned to Eton several times as a stopgap teacher. After university he taught for a while at The Doon School in India before returning to become a full-time assistant master at Eton. He later became a house master. Through his Indian connections he came to have the late Birendra of Nepal in his house. He was eventually rewarded with the Order of the White Elephant, First Class, for his work with the Nepalese Crown Prince.

In August 1940, Lawrence married Helena Frances Lyttelton, the daughter of G. W. Lyttelton (see Viscount Cobham) and Pamela Marie Adeane, herself daughter of Charles Adeane. With her he had two sons and four daughters.

During the Second World War he served in the Royal Navy Volunteer Reserve. Lawrence saw service as a radar officer in the North Atlantic and the Mediterranean. He was mentioned in dispatches following night patrols in the English Channel before D-Day and was demobilised as a Lieutenant Commander (Special Branch).

In 1977 Lawrence retired to Great Milton, Oxfordshire. He was the author of two volumes of photography of Eton (An Eton Camera) and edited many others (including The Encouragement of Learning, an anthology of articles and extracts from many sources covering most aspects of Eton life to the end of the Victorian Age, and Grizel Hartley Remembered, a collection of letters and memories of a unique Eton character). He founded the Museum of Eton Life, and also wrote obituaries of Eton masters for the Daily Telegraph.

See also

Lawrence baronets

References 

Daily Telegraph obituary
Kidd, Charles, Williamson, David (editors). Debrett's Peerage and Baronetage (1990 edition). New York: St Martin's Press, 1990.
Burkes Peerage and Baronetage (2003), s.v. Lawrence, Baronets, of Ealing Park

1913 births
2005 deaths
People educated at Eton College
Teachers at Eton College
Alumni of Christ Church, Oxford
The Doon School faculty